Attorney General West may refer to:

Thomas F. West (1874–1931), Attorney General of Florida
William H. West (judge) (1824–1911), Attorney General of Ohio

See also
General West (disambiguation)